This page lists the official World Champions and the countries they represented in the Professional 10-Dance of the World Dance Council (WDC). The championships are authorized and organized under the auspices of the WDC.

The first World 10 Dance Championships took place in 1978 and has been held annually since they were organised by the ICBD in 1980. The ICBD was renamed WD&DSC and renamed again as the WDC. It represents all the major professional DanceSport countries.

The dances covered in the Ten Dance are the five International Ballroom (Standard) dances: waltz, foxtrot, quickstep, tango and Viennese waltz, along with the five International Latin Dances: rumba, samba, paso doble, cha-cha-cha and jive, as defined in ballroom dancing terms.

World Champions

See also 
World Ballroom Dance Champions
World Latin Dance Champions
Smooth World Champions
Rhythm World Champions
U.S. National Dancesport Champions (Professional 10-Dance)

References 

Dancesport
Ballroom dance
10 Dance